The Compagnie des Guides de Chamonix was founded in 1821 and is the oldest and largest association of guides in the world. The association is based  in Chamonix, France, and also has offices in Argentière and Les Houches which are only open during the high winter and summer seasons.

In the summer of 2021, the Compagnie des Guides de Chamonix will celebrate its 200th anniversary.

References

External links
 http://www.chamonix-guides.eu/

Professional associations based in France
Alpine clubs
Chamonix